Langston Terrace Dwellings are historic structures located in the Langston portion of the Carver/Langston neighborhoods in the Northeast quadrant of Washington, D.C.  The apartments were built between 1935 and 1938 and they were listed on the National Register of Historic Places in 1987.

History

Langston Terrace was the first federally funded housing project in Washington, D.C. and one of the first four in the United States.  It was part of President Franklin Delano Roosevelt’s Public Works Administration and was named in honor of John Mercer Langston, a 19th-century American abolitionist and attorney who founded Howard University Law School, and served as a U.S. congressman from Virginia.  The project cost the government $1.8 million and rooms were available for $6 per month or $4.50 per month without utilities. The complex was co-designed by Bauhaus-trained Washington architect Hilyard Robinson and Los Angeles-based architect Paul Revere Williams in the International Style. The site planning and landscape design were completed by landscape architect David Williston. Unlike Techwood Homes, the first public housing project in the U.S., Langston was open to African American families. Langston Terrace is on the National Register of Historic Places.

Much like Aberdeen Gardens in Virginia, also designed by the famed African American architect Hilyard Robinson, the 274-unit complex was constructed primarily by African American laborers.  The garden style apartment buildings were built around common areas (mews).  Daniel Gillette Olney's The Progress of the Negro Race is a terra-cotta frieze located in the central courtyard.  The frieze depicts African American history from slavery to World War I migration.   Olney's Madonna and Children is located in the same courtyard. Concrete animal sculptures located in the courtyard also serve as climbing structures for children.

See also 

 Housing in Washington, D.C.

References

External links
Langston Terrace - District of Columbia Housing Authority

Residential buildings completed in 1938
Apartment buildings in Washington, D.C.
Residential buildings on the National Register of Historic Places in Washington, D.C.
International Style (architecture)
African-American history of Washington, D.C.
Public Works Administration in Washington, D.C.
Public housing in Washington, D.C.
1938 establishments in Washington, D.C.